A use tax is a type of tax levied in the United States by numerous state governments. It is essentially the same as a sales tax but is applied not where a product or service was sold but where a merchant bought a product or service and then converted it for its own use, without having paid tax when it was initially purchased. Use taxes are functionally equivalent to sales taxes. They are typically levied upon the use, storage, enjoyment, or other consumption in the state of tangible personal property that has not been subjected to a sales tax.

Introduction

Use tax is assessed upon tangible personal property and taxable services purchased by a resident or entity doing business in the taxing state upon the use, storage, enjoyment or consumption of the good or service, regardless of origin of the purchase. Use taxes are designed to discourage the purchase of products that are not subject to the sales tax within a taxing jurisdiction. Use tax may be applied to purchases from out-of-state vendors that are not required to collect tax on their sales within the state. The use tax imposes a compensating tax equal in amount to the sales tax that would have been imposed on the sale of the property, if the sale had occurred within the state's taxing jurisdiction.  The use tax is typically assessed at the same rate as the sales tax that would have been owed, and generally the taxability of the good or service does not vary. However, there are some instances where the sales tax rate and the use tax rate vary.

For example, a resident of Massachusetts, with a 6.25% "sales and use tax" on certain goods and services, purchases non-exempt goods or services in New Hampshire for use, storage or other consumption in Massachusetts. Under New Hampshire law, the New Hampshire vendor collects no sales taxes on the goods, but the Massachusetts purchaser/user must still pay 6.25% of the sales price directly to the Department of Revenue in Massachusetts as a use tax. If the same goods are purchased in a US state that does collect sales tax for such goods at time of purchase, whatever taxes were paid by the purchaser to that state can be deducted (as a tax credit) from the 6.25% owed for subsequent use, storage or consumption in Massachusetts. With few exceptions, no state's vendors will charge the native state's sales tax on goods shipped out of state, meaning all goods ordered from out-of-state are essentially free of sales tax. The purchaser is therefore required to declare and pay the use tax to his home state on these ordered goods.

The assessing jurisdiction may make the use tax payable annually, but some states require a monthly payment. For example, where a Vermont resident has not paid at least 6% sales tax on property brought in for use in the state, Vermont law requires filing a tax return (Form SU-452 and payment) by the 20th day of the month following non-exempt purchases to avoid a $50 late fee, a 5% penalty per month, to a maximum of 25%, plus statutory interest on the unpaid tax and penalties.

There are currently over 14,000 tax jurisdictions in the U.S. and many of these jurisdictions have varying taxability on services. Given the volume of jurisdictions, the source of the sale may also need to be examined, in order to appropriately apply and remit the tax. For instance, states may require use tax based upon the location in which the service was provided, while other states may require use tax based upon the location of "benefit". In traditional repair and maintenance type services, these locations will typically be one and the same, however with complex technology transactions, these locations are often different.

In most cases, this complexity is part of the underlying sales tax laws; but while a brick-and-mortar store has to deal with only the sales tax laws of its own location, remote sellers have to deal with the use tax laws of many jurisdictions—up to every US state and locality that assesses them, if the company has a presence or "nexus" in every state (as large "brick-and-mortar" sellers like Wal-Mart and Best Buy do).

Self-assessment 

The use tax, like the sales tax, is assessed upon the end consumer of the tangible property or service, but the difference is who calculates the tax and how it is accounted for. The sales tax is collected by the seller, who is acting as an agent of the state and thus remits the tax to the state on behalf of the end consumer. On the other hand, the use tax is self-assessed and remitted by the end consumer. From an entity's perspective, the shift from sales to use tax is the equivalent of shifting from an expense account (profit and loss statement implication) to a liability account (balance sheet implication).

To illustrate sales tax, if company XYZ, Inc. purchased $40 of office supplies from an in-state vendor that collected $10 of sales tax:

To illustrate use tax, if company XYZ, Inc. purchased $40 of office supplies from an out-of-state vendor that did not collect sales tax, use tax is self-assessed:

The U.S. Census Bureau  reported in 2014, $271.3 billion dollars in sales and gross receipts were collected by the 45 states that collect sales and use taxes; 33 of the 45 states increased collections year over year. Sales and use taxes combined account for 32% of all taxes collected by all states, second only to personal income tax collections.
The states themselves maintain that use tax collections are the second leading cause of tax deficiencies under audit.

Enforcement 
In 2007, 22 states, including New York, California, Ohio and Virginia have included an entry on their state individual income tax return for taxpayers to voluntarily calculate an amount for use tax liability. Taxpayers, however, have been reluctant to pay taxes to the state. A few of these states have tried another approach by pre-determining the tax liability owed by every taxpayer by a tax table based on the individual's adjusted gross income. For example, a Michigan taxpayer with $45,000 of income can use the state's use tax table to estimate his use tax liability as $36. However, use of this table is limited to purchases of less than $1,000 and may be challenged during an audit. For purchases over $1,000, the taxpayer must calculate the tax for each item and add this amount to the use tax from the table. States using this method have seen an increase in voluntary compliance over those states that have the taxpayers calculate the use tax themselves.

As the amount of e-commerce sales continues to rise ($34 billion for just the second quarter of 2008) states recognize that the key to collecting these taxes rests not only in educating the individual taxpayer but with coordinating their efforts with other states. Currently, there are 19 full member states and 3 associate member states that belong to the Streamlined Sales Tax Project (SSTP). The SSTP assists states in collection of sales and use tax by registering merchants who charge out-of-state consumers the appropriate state sales tax and remit the tax to the appropriate state through a certified service provider. SSTP has also been in the forefront of an effort to push Congress to amend the laws to make collection of sales tax less burdensome. In fact, in May 2013, the United States Senate passed a bill that would give the states authority to require sellers to collect sales tax on out-of-state sales.  The House of Representatives must still pass the bill and send it to the President of the United States before it becomes law.

States may also work with adjacent states via interstate use tax agreements. These agreements allow states to exchange tax audit records from businesses that have shipped goods to out of state consumers. Reciprocal states will then use those records and send a tax bill including penalties and interest to the individual taxpayer.

States have also pursued their collection efforts through the court system. In 2007, a California appeals court ruled that Borders Online owed California sales tax for online purchases that the store failed to collect from 1998 to 1999 since customers were able to return merchandise bought on-line to Border's retail stores in California.

Exemptions
Exemptions are typically offered based upon the type of customer:
 Resale - Resale certificates are the most commonly used of the sales tax exemption certificates. Sales taxes are applied to retail sales and so sales for the purpose of reselling are exempt to avoid double taxation. Reselling and wholesaling account for $844 billion of the American GDP, or 3.3%.
 Manufacturing - Manufacturing exemption certificates generally apply to manufacturers of tangible personal property, industrial processors, and refineries that produce tangible personal property for sale at retail. Each state outlines specific equipment and/or consumables that are eligible for the exemption. Estimates show (as discussed further in the Statistics Section) that $2.08 trillion and 12.5% of GDP is associated with the manufacturing sector.  
 Agricultural - Agricultural exemptions are generally applied to sales of tangible property that will be utilized in farming, raising livestock, and maintaining agricultural land. According to the US Department of Agriculture, $412.3 billion of GDP relates to agriculture, and $5.816 trillion of tangible assets are in use for agricultural purposes. Estimates derived from gross sales of sampled states with exemption certificates that were annualized and stratified show that $45 million of state reported gross sales are associated with the agriculture sector.  
 Government - The federal government is exempt from sales and use taxes per federal statute. Additionally, many states (all except Arizona) exempt their state governments by state statute. Not all states require a certificate for government exemption. Estimates show that approximately $19 trillion gross sales are associated to federal and state governments, which ties to actual reported on GDP reporting.  
 Exempt Organizations - Exempt organizations are generally defined as they are in Internal Revenue Code §501(c). Additionally, many states require the Internal Revenue Code letter establishing the organization as exempt as a supplement to the exemption certificate. Estimates show that approximately $1.5 billion of gross sales are associated to exempt organizations.   
 Construction Contracting - Construction and/or Capital Improvements may also be exempt per state statute or regulation. There may be different treatment for new construction and capital improvements. Construction contractors may be exempt from paying sales tax upon purchasing but will be required to pay use tax upon incorporation into real property. Construction accounts for $520.3 billion of GDP.
 Aircraft - Aircraft, aircraft parts, and aircraft labor are generally exempt because aircraft are used in multiple states. Air services accounts for $63.3 billion of GDP.

Exemptions are also offered upon the usage of the property. For instance, the most common types of exemptions are for resellers, who purchase the goods to resell them so they are not the end consumer. Manufacturers are also exempt when they purchase goods that ultimately are incorporated into tangible personal property that is destined for the open market. Again, the manufacturer is not the ultimate consumer of the good. Several states also offer Direct Pay Permits, which are issued to manufacturers allowing them to purchase the goods intended for incorporation into tangible personal property. Such manufacturers may also use the same goods or parts for repair and maintenance of their existing products previously purchased by the end consumer. Thus, the burden of tax liability shifts from the seller of the goods to the manufacturer. The manufacturer will purchase all goods tax exempt with the Direct Pay Permit but is required to accrue and remit tax on goods that are taken from inventory (intended for incorporation into tangible personal property held for sale) and consumed by the manufacturer. That is done because the manufacturer has better visibility to the usage of its property and so is in a better position to determine if use tax should apply.

Direct pay permits 
Direct pay permits are generally used by manufacturers that purchase tangible personal property for resale and their own use. They usually require the seller to exempt the purchases and pay use tax upon removal from inventory. Manufacturers will either use an exemption certificate or will rely on a state issued direct pay permit/agreement.

A direct payment permit allows a business to purchase taxable goods and services without paying tax to the vendor and to remit the correct use tax directly to the DRS. That allows businesses the necessary time to determine how much tax to assess on their purchases.

Burden of proof 
The ultimate burden of responsibility to verify the validity of the exemption lies with the issuer of the certificate. That is, the reseller or manufacturer who provided the certificate to the seller has the burden of proof and the financial responsibility for the tax, penalties, and interest if the proof is not met. The seller, as a collection agent for the state, can be made liable for the uncollected taxes if the burden of proof is not met, as outlined by state law and/or regulation.

There are two principles of proof used by states:

Good faith acceptance is defined as "total absence of intention to seek unfair advantage or to defraud another party; honest intention to fulfill one's obligations; observance of reasonable standards of fair dealing." In practice, that translates to accepting a completed certificate that appears reasonable on its face. For example, reasonableness for a manufacturer of widgets would be the purchase of raw materials such as metals or plastics, tools, etc. The purchase of children's toys or clothing would be unreasonable for the same manufacturer of widgets.

Strict liability acceptance is defined as "Liability that does not depend on actual negligence or intent to harm, but that is based on the breach of an absolute duty to make something safe."   Then, the liability of the seller is relieved upon receipt of the certificate, the seller has no obligation to validate the statements made by the purchaser.

See also
 Interstate commerce clause
 Tax exemption
 Tax holiday
 Tax-free shopping
 Taxing and Spending Clause, specifically Article I, Section 9, Clause 5
 Quill Corp. v. North Dakota

References

External links 
  California BOE Use Tax FAQ
 Maine use tax FAQ
 Massachusetts use tax statute.
 Arkansas sales & use tax rules
 Streamlined Sales Tax Project

Local taxation
State taxation in the United States
Tax terms
Sales taxes